Carol Fukunaga (born December 12, 1947) is an American lawyer and politician.

Born in Honolulu, Hawaii, Fukunaga received her bachelor's degree from the University of Hawaiʻi at Mānoa and her Juris Doctor degree from the William S. Richardson School of Law. She practiced law in Honolulu. Fukunaga served in the Hawaii Constitutional Convention of 1978. She then served in the Hawaii House of Representatives from 1978 to 1982 and from 1986 to 1992 and was a Democrat. From 1982 to 1986, Fukunaga served as the executive officer for the Lieutenant Governor of Hawaii. Fukunaga served in the Hawaii Senate from 1992 to 2012. Since 2012, Fukunaga has served on the Honolulu City Council.

References

|-

|-

|-

|-

|-

1947 births
Living people
21st-century American politicians
21st-century American women politicians
Politicians from Honolulu
University of Hawaiʻi at Mānoa alumni
Hawaii lawyers
Women state legislators in Hawaii
Honolulu City Council members
Hawaii politicians of Japanese descent
Democratic Party Hawaii state senators
Democratic Party members of the Hawaii House of Representatives
American women of Japanese descent in politics
Women city councillors in Hawaii
Asian-American city council members
William S. Richardson School of Law alumni